The 1951–52 season was the first edition of Liga Alef, which had replaced the Israeli League as the top division of football in Israel following a year-long hiatus. It took place between October 1951 to June 1952 and was contested by 12 clubs, the same ones which had played in the top flight during the 1949–50 season minus Maccabi Nes Tziona.

Maccabi Tel Aviv won their second consecutive championship, whilst the two Rishon LeZion clubs, Hapoel and Maccabi were relegated. Maccabi Tel Aviv's Yehoshua Glazer was the top scorer with 27 goals.

At the time, the league was played with two points for a win and one for a draw.

Final table

Results

References
Israel - List of Final Tables RSSSF

Liga Alef seasons
Israel
1951–52 in Israeli football leagues